The 10 cm Feldhaubitze M 99 was a howitzer used by Austria-Hungary during World War I.

It had a barrel from the so-called steel bronze (92% copper bronze strengthened by autofrettage which was used due to the lack of steel industry in Austria, see Franz von Uchatius), and lacked a modern recoil system, using only an ineffective spring-mounted spade brake, so was virtually obsolescent on its introduction. Nonetheless, it was the standard field howitzer for the Austrian Army at the outbreak of the war.

It donated its barrel to the 10 cm Gebirgshaubitze M 99, although few of those were made, being largely replaced by a version of the standard Feldhaubitze M 99 with a narrow,  carriage for use on mountain paths. The axle seats were deleted from these narrow carriages in the interest of saving weight.

References 
 Ortner, M. Christian. The Austro-Hungarian Artillery From 1867 to 1918: Technology, Organization, and Tactics. Vienna, Verlag Militaria, 2007 

World War I howitzers
World War I artillery of Austria-Hungary
104 mm artillery